Airwave Gliders was an Austrian aircraft manufacturer based in Fulpmes. The company specialized in the design and manufacture of hang gliders and paragliders.

The company was founded in 1979 and went out of business circa 2009. As of 2019, the Airwave website still exists, but it just refers visitors to Bruce Goldsmith Design for support for Airwave products.

The company produced a wide range of aircraft including Bruce Goldsmith paraglider designs, such as the Airwave Magic, Scenic, Sport, Ten and the Wave.

History
Airwave was formed in 1979 in the United Kingdom as a hang glider manufacturer. Its early designs were flown by the leading British hang glider pilots to many World Hang Gliding Championships.

Bruce Goldsmith started the paragliding division of the company's business in 1989. In 1997, John Pendry took first place in the World Paragliding Championships with an Airwave paraglider. Goldsmith later left Airwave to work for other companies.

In November 1999, Markus Villinger bought the company and moved it to the Stubaital, Austria, located in the Central Eastern Alps region. He had previously run Wills Wing Europe, the distributor for Wills Wing hang gliders. Villinger persuaded Goldsmith to return to Airwave in May 2000 and his paraglider designs were produced by subcontractors. Goldsmith worked from his home in Gréolières, France, which has a climate that permits year-round paraglider flight. Villinger eventually sold the company and went into the field of real estate development instead.

Villinger later bought the company back and relocated it to Fulpmes, where he produced his own hang glider designs and Goldsmith's paraglider designs.

By 2008, company had ceased production of its own hang glider designs and became an importer of Wills Wing hang gliders, while continuing to have paragliders manufacturered by contractors. It seems to have gone out of business about 2009 as part of the Great Recession.

As of 2016, Goldsmith was still providing technical support and spares for Airwave gliders, though his new company Bruce Goldsmith Design.

Aircraft 
Summary of aircraft built by Airwave Gliders:

Paragliders
Airwave Alpine Extreme
Airwave Burn
Airwave Gecko
Airwave Kiss
Airwave Logic
Airwave Magic
Airwave Mustang
Airwave Scenic
Airwave Slingshot
Airwave Sport
Airwave Ten
Airwave Wave

References

External links

Company website archives on Archive.org

Defunct aircraft manufacturers of Austria
Defunct aircraft manufacturers of the United Kingdom
Hang gliders
Paragliders